WASP-42 is a K-type main-sequence star. Its surface temperature is 5315 K. WASP-42 is similar to the Sun in concentration of heavy elements, with metallicity ([Fe/H]) of 0.05, and is much older than the Sun at  billion years. The star does exhibit starspot activity as is typical for its spectral class.

Multiplicity surveys did not detect any stellar companions to WASP-42 in 2017.

Planetary system
In 2012, one planet, named WASP-42b, was discovered on a tight, mildly eccentric orbit. The planetary equilibrium temperature is 1021 K.

References

Centaurus (constellation)
Planetary transit variables
K-type main-sequence stars
Planetary systems with one confirmed planet
J12515557-4204249